Liudmyla Vasylieva (born 22 June 1969) is a Ukrainian former fencer. She competed in the individual and team foil events at the 2000 Summer Olympics.

References

External links
 

1969 births
Living people
Ukrainian female foil fencers
Olympic fencers of Ukraine
Fencers at the 2000 Summer Olympics
20th-century Ukrainian women
21st-century Ukrainian women